Randolph Duane Ross (born December 5, 1972) is an American collegiate track and field coach, and former athlete, specializing in the 110 meters hurdles. He is currently the Director of Track and Field programs for the University of Tennessee and is best known for winning the bronze medal at the 1999 World Championships in Athletics and representing the United States at the 2004 Athens Olympics. Ross also won the 1995 NCAA championship in the 110-meter hurdles, and as a 7-time All-American and 5 Time ACC champion is Clemson University's most decorated male hurdler.

Biography

Early life
Ross was born in Shelby, North Carolina, and grew up in Dallas, North Carolina, where he attended North Gaston High School. At the encouragement of his Football coach, Ross took up track and field as a way to rehabilitate an injured ankle. As a junior, Ross went on the become NCHSAA state champion in the 110 metres Hurdles. After receiving a number of scholarships from various collegiate teams, Ross signed with Clemson University.

Athletic career
As a college athlete at Clemson University, he won the 110 m hurdles at the 1995 NCAA Men's Outdoor Track and Field Championship for the Clemson Tigers. He made his first appearance on the world track stage at the 1997 IAAF World Indoor Championships, where he finished fourth in the 60 meters hurdles competition, just behind compatriot Tony Dees. He returned at the 1999 IAAF World Indoor Championships in Maebashi, but again failed to reach the podium with another fourth-place finish, this time losing out to Falk Balzer. He had greater success outdoors that year, as he won the bronze medal in the 110 m hurdles at the 1999 World Championships in Athletics in his career personal best time of 13.12 seconds. An appearance at the 1999 IAAF Grand Prix Final, however, brought yet another fourth-place finish.

He was the runner up at the 2004 United States Olympic Trials and competed at the 2004 Summer Olympics in Athens, Greece. He failed to reach the final after running 13.30 seconds for fifth place in the semi-finals of the men's hurdles competition.

Following the analysis of information received from BALCO in 2010, Ross was called to testify in a case against his coach Trevor Graham. The U.S. Anti-Doping Agency (USADA) suspended Ross for two years for attempted use, possession, and trafficking of performance-enhancing drugs. As a term of his suspension, all his results from November 2001 onward were nullified.

Coaching career
He returned to Clemson as a volunteer coach and in 1996. After retiring from international competition, Ross was hired by Division III Methodist University as Head Coach of their Track and Field program. While at Methodist, Ross coached the women's team to three Mason–Dixon Conference championships and placed in the top four at both the NCAA Indoor and Outdoor Championships. Ross also earned USTFCCCA South/Southeast Region Coach of the Year honors. In 2012, after five seasons at Methodist, Ross was hired as director of track & field at Division I North Carolina A&T University. Under Ross, the Aggies swept both the men's and women's outdoor and indoor Mid-Eastern Athletic Conference championships for the first time in program history. Following the success of the 2017 seasons, Ross coached 13 athletes, more than any HBCU in history, who competed in the 2017 NCAA Division I National Championships.

In 2021, after leading North Carolina A&T's men's track and field team to a third place finish at the 2021 NCAA Division I Outdoor Track and Field Championships, Ross was named 2021 NCAA co-coach of the year. Four athletes from the team went on to compete in the 2020 Summer Olympics, including Ross's son Randolph Ross and Trevor Stewart.

In May 2022, Ross was hired as the new head coach at Tennessee, signing a five-year contract for $450,000 annually.

Statistics

Personal bests

60m Hurdles progression

110m Hurdles progression

International competitions

National competitions

Coaching record

References

External links
 Duane Ross at USATF
 
 
 

1972 births
Living people
American male hurdlers
African-American male track and field athletes
Olympic track and field athletes of the United States
Athletes (track and field) at the 2004 Summer Olympics
World Athletics Championships athletes for the United States
World Athletics Championships medalists
Clemson Tigers men's track and field athletes
American sportspeople in doping cases
North Carolina A&T Aggies track and field coaches
Clemson Tigers track and field coaches
People from Dallas, North Carolina
21st-century African-American sportspeople
20th-century African-American sportspeople